Edward Richard Basden  (born February 15, 1983) is an American professional basketball player who formerly played in the National Basketball Association (NBA).

College career
Basden, born in Upper Marlboro, Maryland, played competitive basketball in Greenbelt, Maryland at Eleanor Roosevelt High School, where he played against former Chicago Bulls teammate Mike Sweetney. He verbally committed to play college basketball at UMass, choosing them over Villanova, Maryland, Georgetown and George Mason. He was released from his letter of intent following the resignation of Minutemen head coach Bruiser Flint, and Basden then committed to play for Charlotte. During his career with the 49ers he was named Conference USA Player of the Year in 2005, and Defensive Player of the Year in 2004 and 2005. In his senior season he was also named National Defensive Player of the Year by many college basketball analysts. He is the Conference USA all-time leader in career steals, and holds the all-time Charlotte record for steals. His #13 jersey was retired on February 19, 2009.

Professional career
Basden went undrafted in the 2005 NBA draft, but was invited to play on the Chicago Bulls Reebok Summer League team, where a strong performance earned him a two-year contract with the Bulls.  He appeared in 19 games for the Bulls in 2005–06, averaging 2.1 points per game.

On August 18, 2006, Basden was traded by the Bulls to the Cleveland Cavaliers for center Martynas Andriuskevicius. He was later signed by Fenerbahçe of Turkey. He averaged 8.4 points, 5.3 rebounds and 3.3 assists in 25 minutes for Fenerbahçe in the Euroleague and was one of key players in the team's 2007 Turkish Basketball League championship.

Basden later played for the Austin Toros of the NBA D-League. After finishing his contract with the Toros, he went to play for the Alaska Aces of the Philippine Basketball Association, but was ultimately rejected for exceeding the league's  height limit. In March 2011 he signed with Maroussi BC in Greece. In October 2011 he signed with Franca Basquetebol Clube in Brazil. In 2012, he signed as an import with the Petron Blaze Boosters of the Philippine Basketball Association. He later played for various teams in Latin America.

Career highlights
 2004 Conference USA Defensive Player of the Year
 2005 Conference USA Defensive Player of the Year
 2005 Conference USA Player of the Year
 2005 Conference USA All-Time Steals Leader
 2005 ESPN National Defensive Player of the Year
 2007 Turkish Basketball League Champion with Fenerbahçe

References

External links
RealGM profile
Fenerbahce player profile
TBLStat.net profile

1983 births
Living people
American expatriate basketball people in Brazil
American expatriate basketball people in France
American expatriate basketball people in Germany
American expatriate basketball people in Greece
American expatriate basketball people in Mexico
American expatriate basketball people in the Philippines
American expatriate basketball people in Turkey
American men's basketball players
Austin Toros players
Basketball players from Maryland
Big3 players
Charlotte 49ers men's basketball players
Chicago Bulls players
Cholet Basket players
Fenerbahçe men's basketball players
Franca Basquetebol Clube players
Gigantes del Estado de México players
Huracanes de Tampico players
Maroussi B.C. players
Mersin Büyükşehir Belediyesi S.K. players
People from Greenbelt, Maryland
People from Upper Marlboro, Maryland
Philippine Basketball Association imports
San Miguel Beermen players
Shooting guards
Sportspeople from the Washington metropolitan area
Telekom Baskets Bonn players
Trotamundos B.B.C. players
Tulsa 66ers players
Undrafted National Basketball Association players
American men's 3x3 basketball players